The Westdeutsche Allgemeine Zeitung (WAZ) is a commercial newspaper from Essen, Germany, published by Funke Mediengruppe.

History and profile
Westdeutsche Allgemeine Zeitung was founded by Erich Brost and first published 3 April 1948. The paper has its headquarters in Essen. During the third quarter of 1992 Westdeutsche Allgemeine Zeitung had a circulation of 626,000 copies.

See also 
 List of newspapers in Germany

References

External links

 
1948 establishments in Germany
German-language newspapers
Mass media in Essen
Daily newspapers published in Germany
Publications established in 1948
German news websites